Stéphane Waite was the goaltending coach for the Montreal Canadiens of the National Hockey League from 2013 up until March 2nd 2021. He was previously the goaltending coach for the Chicago Blackhawks, where he won the Stanley Cup in 2010 and 2013. He spend 10 years as a goalie coach in Chicago.  He married Annie Cloutier on the June 30th 2001. They have a son named Frédérick Waite. He owns his goalie school in Sherbrooke, Terrebonne and Brossard since 1988.(www.ecolegardienswaite.com)

References

External links
Chicago Blackhawks profile
 http://www.hockeydb.com/ihdb/stats/pdisplay.php?pid=64426
 http://www.ecolegardienswaite.com

Date of birth unknown
Living people
Chicago Blackhawks coaches
Ice hockey people from Quebec
Montreal Canadiens coaches
Sportspeople from Sherbrooke
Sherbrooke Castors coaches
Stanley Cup champions
1965 births